Syrjäntaka is a village in Hämeenlinna, Finland. It was the administrative center of the former municipality of Tuulos, consolidated with Hämeenlinna in 2009. The population of Syrjäntaka is about 600 (2012).

History of Syrjäntaka dates back to the Middle Ages, but the old village was destroyed in the 1918 Finnish Civil War Battle of Syrjäntaka.

References 

Villages in Finland
Hämeenlinna